José Torres (1936–2009) was a Puerto Rican Olympic and professional boxer.

José Torres may also refer to:

Sportspeople
 José Torres (athlete) (1903–?), Mexican long-distance runner
 José Torres (footballer, born 1938) (1938–2010), Portuguese footballer
 José Francisco Torres (born 1987), American soccer player
 José Torres (cyclist) (1889–19??), Chilean road racing cyclist
 José Anthony Torres (born 1972), Panamanian footballer
 José Torres Laboy (born 1971), Puerto Rican sport shooter
 José Torres (baseball) (born 1993), Venezuelan MLB baseball player
 José Luis Torres (footballer, born 1994), Uruguayan footballer
 José Luis Torres (footballer, born 1995), Argentine footballer
 Gacho Torres (José Torres, 1896–1963), Puerto Rican baseball player
 Monster Pain, real name José Torres (born 1982), Puerto Rican professional wrestler

Others
 José Torres (musician) (born 1958), Cuban-Polish musician
 Joey Torres, full name Jose "Joey" Torres (first elected 1990), American politician
 José Antonio Torres (Cuban journalist) (graduated college 1990), Cuban journalist
 José Antonio Torres (director) (born 1973), Mexican film director, producer, and musician
 José Alfredo Torres Huitrón (born 1973), Mexican politician
 José Antonio Torres Martinó (1916–2011), Puerto Rican painter, artist, journalist and writer
 José de Torres (1665–1738), Spanish composer
 José Filipe Torres (born 1976), Portuguese entrepreneur
 José María Torres (1794–1835), Argentine Army officer
 José Ortega Torres (born 1943), Spanish poet
 José Pichy Torres Zamora (born 1971), Puerto Rican politician
 José Sigona Torres (born 1953), Mexican politician
 José Torres Ramírez (born 1972), Puerto Rican politician

See also
 Joe Torres (disambiguation)